The 2016 AVP Pro Beach Volleyball Tour was a domestic professional beach volleyball circuit organized in the United States by the Association of Volleyball Professionals (AVP) for the 2016 beach volleyball season.

Schedule

This is the complete schedule of events on the 2016 calendar, with team progression documented from the semifinals stage. All tournaments consisted of single-elimination qualifying rounds followed by a double-elimination main draw.

Men

Women

Milestones and events
New Orleans Open

AVP Championships
Two rule changes were tested at the AVP Championships: a "point freeze" at match point, wherein the scoring system changes from rally scoring (either team can score a point on every serve) to side-out scoring (only serving team can score a point) when either team reaches match point; "Let" serves, wherein the ball touches the net while crossing over into the opponent's court during service, are not allowed and the serve will be replayed.

Statistics leaders

Men's statistical leaders

Women's statistical leaders

Points distribution

Awards
The season's top performers were chosen based on statistics, player votes and AVP national ranking points earned during the year.

References

Association of Volleyball Professionals
AVP Pro Beach Volleyball Tour